Mo Myeong-hui (born 4 March 1963) is a South Korean sprinter. She competed in the women's 200 metres at the 1984 Summer Olympics.

Mo was chosen for the South Korean national team as a first-year student at Inil Girls' High School, and later attended Seoul National University. She originally announced her retirement five years later in December 1983, but later chose to continue competing.

Notes

References

External links
 

1963 births
Living people
Athletes (track and field) at the 1984 Summer Olympics
South Korean female sprinters
Olympic athletes of South Korea
Place of birth missing (living people)
Seoul National University alumni
Asian Games medalists in athletics (track and field)
Asian Games bronze medalists for South Korea
Athletes (track and field) at the 1982 Asian Games
Medalists at the 1982 Asian Games
Olympic female sprinters